Evgeny Romanovich Chuprun (June 3, 1927 – January 7, 2005) was a Russian Soviet realist painter, who lived and worked in Leningrad. He was a member of the Leningrad branch of Union of Artists of Russian Federation,<ref>Directory of members of the Leningrad branch of Union of Artists of Russian Federation. - Leningrad: Khudozhnik RSFSR, 1987. - p.146.</ref> and regarded as one of representatives of the Leningrad school of painting, most famous for his maritime paintings.

 Biography 
Evgeny Romanovich Chuprun was born June 3, 1927, in the town of Ilovaisk, Donetsk Province of Ukrainian SSR, USSR.

In 1949 Evgeny Chuprun graduated from Kaspiysk Higher Navy School named after Sergei Kirov, located in the city of Baku, Azerbaijan. From 1949 to 1975, he served in the Navy, has held several command posts.

Evgeny Chuprun has participated in art exhibitions since 1960 as maritime and historical painter, and landscape painter. Professional training he held from noted artists Alexander Sokolov, Nikolai Galakhov, Vladimir Seleznev. His personal exhibitions were in Leningrad in 1986, and 1989.

The main themes in the work of Evgeny Chuprun were seascapes, historic sailing vessels, genre and historical compositions on the theme of the fleet and life on the Neva River. His style determined interest in rebuilding by picturesque means the true face of historical ships or historical situation, with natural lighting and natural conditions of air and water.

Since 1980, Evgeny Chuprun was a member of the Leningrad Union of Artists (since 1992, named as Saint Petersburg Union of Artists).

Evgeny Romanovich Chuprun died in Saint Petersburg in 2005. His paintings reside in the Art and History Museums and private collections in the Russia, in the U.S., Japan, France, and others.

 See also 
 Leningrad School of Painting
 List of painters of Saint Petersburg Union of Artists
 Saint Petersburg Union of Artists

 References 

 Bibliography 
 Directory of members of the Leningrad branch of Union of Artists of Russian Federation. - Leningrad: Khudozhnik RSFSR, 1987. - p. 146.
 Peinture Russe. Catalogue. — Paris: Drouot Richelieu, 26 Avril 1991. - p. 11-12.
 Paintings of 1950-1980s by the Leningrad School's artists. Exhibition catalogue. – Saint Petersburg: Saint Petersburg Union of artists, 1994. - p. 4.
 Sergei V. Ivanov. Unknown Socialist Realism. The Leningrad School.'' – Saint Petersburg: NP-Print Edition, 2007. – pp. 21, 47, 172, 372, 400-402, 404, 420-422. , .

External links 

 Exhibition of Evgeny Chuprun in ARKA Fine Art Gallery

1927 births
2005 deaths
20th-century Russian painters
21st-century Russian painters
Leningrad School artists
Members of the Leningrad Union of Artists
Painters from Saint Petersburg
Russian male painters
Russian marine artists
Socialist realist artists
20th-century Russian male artists
21st-century Russian male artists